Fred's Final Fling is a 1980 animated television special and the second of The Flintstone Special limited-run prime time revival of The Flintstones produced by Hanna-Barbera Productions which premiered on NBC on November 7, 1980. It is an hour-long primetime special, broadcast as part of the 1980-1981 series The Flintstone Primetime Specials.

Like many animated series created by Hanna-Barbera in the 1970s, the show contained a laugh track created by the studio, one of the last productions to do so.

Summary
When Frank Frankenstone's X-rays are mistaken for Fred's, the doctor tells him he only has 24 hours to live. Dazed by the news, Fred vows to do good deeds on his final day. After giving gifts to friends, he takes Wilma, Barney and Betty to the La Coo Coo Rocko restaurant where they dance the night away and go roller-skating. After falling asleep with exhaustion, Fred wakes up the next morning with the news that rumors of his demise were greatly exaggerated and that it was all a mistake.

Voice cast
Henry Corden as Fred Flintstone
Mel Blanc as Barney Rubble, Dino
Jean Vander Pyl as Wilma Flintstone, Pebbles Flintstone
Gay Autterson as Betty Rubble
John Stephenson as Frank Frankenstone
Don Messick as Dr. Bonestone

Home media
On October 9, 2012, Warner Archive released Fred's Final Fling on DVD in region 1 as part of their Hanna–Barbera Classics Collection, in a release entitled The Flintstones Prime-Time Specials Collection: Volume 2.  This is a Manufacture-on-Demand (MOD) release, available exclusively through Warner's online store and Amazon.com.

References

External links

1980 television specials
1980 films
1980s animated television specials
1980s American animated films
NBC television specials
1980s American television specials
The Flintstones television specials
Hanna-Barbera television specials
Films directed by Ray Patterson (animator)